Breyers is a brand of ice cream started in 1866 by William A. Breyer in Philadelphia, Pennsylvania.

History

In 1866, William A. Breyer began to produce and sell iced cream in Philadelphia, Pennsylvania, first from his home, and later via horse and wagon on the streets. Breyer's son Henry incorporated the business in 1908.  The formerly independent Breyer Ice Cream Company was sold to the National Dairy Products Corporation/Sealtest in 1926. National Dairy then changed its name to Kraftco in 1968, and Kraft by 1975. Kraft sold its ice cream brands to Unilever in 1993, while retaining the rights to the name for yogurt products.

Ice cream
Prior to 2006, Breyers was known for producing ice cream with a small number of all-natural ingredients. 

In recent years, as part of cost-cutting measures since their move from Green Bay, Wisconsin, to Unilever's U.S. headquarters in Englewood Cliffs, New Jersey, Unilever has reformulated many of its flavors with nontraditional, additive ingredients, significantly changing the taste and texture of their desserts as a result. Following similar practices by several of their competitors, and to the consternation of many former customers, Breyers' list of ingredients has expanded to include thickeners, low-cost sweeteners, food coloring and low-cost additives — including natural additives such as tara gum and carob bean gum; artificial additives such as maltodextrin and propylene glycol; and common artificially separated and extracted ingredients such as corn syrup, whey, and others.  An ingredient list for Breyers Frozen Dairy Dessert may now include up to forty ingredients:

One result of these cost-cutting practices has been that many (but not all) of Breyers' products no longer contain enough milk and cream to meet labeling requirements for ice cream, and are now labeled "Frozen Dairy Dessert" in the United States and "Frozen Dessert" in Canada.

For several decades over 30% of Breyers products, including most of its products sold in the Northeastern U.S., were produced in a large plant outside Boston, in Framingham, Massachusetts. As part of cost-cutting by Unilever, the plant was closed in March 2011.

Marketing
In the 1980s, when Breyers produced all-natural ice cream, the company ran a television advertisement in North America featuring a child who attempted to read an ingredients list from another ice cream brand and experienced extreme difficulty pronouncing several listed artificial additives. The child then turned to the Breyers package and easily read the names of ingredients like milk, cream, and strawberry.

Confusion with Dreyer's
In the Western U.S. and Texas, Breyers ice cream is sometimes confused with Dreyer's ice cream.  Henry Breyer founded Breyers in 1908 in Philadelphia, Pennsylvania, while  William Dreyer and Joseph Edy co-founded Edy's Grand Ice Cream in 1928 in Oakland, California.  The root of the confusion dates to 1953, when "Edy's Grand Ice Cream" was changed to "Dreyer's Grand Ice Cream". Seeking to eliminate the confusion this created, Dreyer's changed its brand name in the home market of Breyers from "Dreyer's Grand" back to "Edy's Grand" in 1981. Around that same time Breyers had begun an expansion towards the West Coast — the home market of Dreyer's — and by the mid-1980s was distributing ice cream throughout the western U.S. and Texas. Unlike Dreyer's, Breyers kept its brand name nationally, and as a result, both Breyers and Dreyer's can be found on store shelves in the western U.S. and Texas.

Yogurt
Breyers Yogurt was a brand of yogurt, owned by Kraft Foods then by CoolBrands International, a former Canadian frozen foods manufacturer. After CoolBrands ran into financial trouble, it was sold in 2007 to Healthy Food Holdings, an affiliate of Catterton Partners, a private equity firm based in Greenwich, Connecticut. 

The yogurt was manufactured under license from Unilever at an upstate New York facility until the licensing agreement was terminated and the Breyers Yogurt line was discontinued in April 2011. Catterton continued to produce YoCrunch yogurt but without the Breyers co-branding until it sold the company in August 2013 to Group Danone.

See also

 Henry West Breyer Sr. House
 List of ice cream brands

References

External links
 

Food and drink introduced in 1866
Products introduced in 1866
1926 mergers and acquisitions
1993 mergers and acquisitions
Unilever brands
Ice cream brands
History of Philadelphia
Cuisine of Philadelphia